Morris Harvey (25 September 187724 August 1944) was a British actor and writer. A renowned character actor, he also wrote for the stage, including material for Broadway revues, in which he also appeared. He was the stepfather of film director Anthony Harvey.

Filmography

References

External links
 
 
 Revue by Morris Harvey and Fred Thompson on Great War Theatre

1877 births
1944 deaths
Male actors from London
British male stage actors
British male film actors
20th-century British male actors